Baseball at the 2008 Summer Olympics in Beijing was held from August 13 to August 23. All games were played at Wukesong Baseball Field, a temporary venue constructed at the Beijing Wukesong Culture & Sports Center. For the third time in Olympic competition, professional baseball players were eligible to participate, though no active players from Major League Baseball were available.

This was the last Olympic baseball tournament before the International Olympic Committee voted to remove baseball from the program in the 2012 Olympics. Along with softball, baseball was rejected for inclusion in the 2016 Summer Olympics at the IOC's meeting in October 2009.  However, following a 2016 IOC vote, baseball was again included for the 2020 Games.

This was also the first time that the IBAF's new extra-innings rule was officially in effect, allowing each team to start with two base runners from the 11th inning on. South Korea won the gold medal in a 3–2 final victory against Cuba.

Medalists

Competition format
Eight teams are competing in the Olympic baseball tournament, and the competition consists of two rounds. The preliminary round follows a round robin format, where each of the teams plays all the other teams once. Following this, the top four teams advance to a single elimination round culminating in the bronze and gold medal games.

Qualification

 Chinese Taipei is the official IOC designation for the state officially referred to as the Republic of China (ROC), commonly known as Taiwan.

Team squad

Group stage
All times are China Standard Time (UTC+8)

August 13

August 14

August 15

August 16

August 17

August 18

August 19

August 20

Knockout stage

Semifinals

Bronze medal match

Gold medal match

Final standings

Notes

References
IOC Baseball
International Baseball Federation
Confederation of European Baseball
NBC Olympics Schedule
Stats from the 2008 Olympics: Baseball at SimCentral.NET

External links
Baseball – Official Results Book

 
2008 Summer Olympics events
Summer Olympics
2008
2008 Summer Olympics
Baseball in Beijing